New Hope is a city in Hennepin County, Minnesota, United States and a suburb of Minneapolis. The population was 21,986 at the 2020 census.

History
New Hope was originally a farming community called Hope in Crystal Lake Township. In 1936, rural residents of the township broke away and formed their own township, choosing the name New Hope.

Geography
It is 12 miles northwest of downtown Minneapolis.

Climate

According to the Köppen Climate Classification system, New Hope has a hot-summer humid continental climate, abbreviated "Dfa" on climate maps.

Demographics

2010 census
As of the census of 2010, there were 20,339 people, 8,427 households, and 5,032 families living in the city. The racial makeup of the city was 74.5% White, 14.7% African American, 0.4% Native American, 3.8% Asian, 2.9% from other races, and 3.6% from two or more races. Hispanic or Latino of any race were 6.5% of the population.

There were 8,427 households, of which 28.4% had children under age 18 living with them, 43.1% were married couples living together, 12.6% had a female householder with no husband present, 4.0% had a male householder with no wife present, and 40.3% were non-families. 33.3% of all households were made up of individuals, and 13.1% had someone living alone who was 65 or older. The average household size was 2.31 and the average family size was 2.97.

The median age in the city was 39.4. 22% of residents were under 18; 7.3% were between 18 and 24; 27.8% were from 25 to 44; 24.4% were from 45 to 64; and 18.6% were 65 or older. The gender makeup of the city was 46.9% male and 53.1% female.

2000 census
As of the census of 2000, there were 20,873 people, 8,665 households, and 5,268 families living in the city. The racial makeup of the city was 86.66% White, 5.78% African American, 0.46% Native American, 3.21% Asian, 0.04% Pacific Islander, 1.74% from other races, and 2.11% from two or more races. Hispanic or Latino of any race were 3.45% of the population.

There were 8,665 households, of which 27.2% had children under 18 living with them, 47.2% were married couples living together, 10.4% had a female householder with no husband present, and 39.2% were non-families. 32.3% of all households were made up of individuals, and 12.5% had someone living alone who was 65 or older. The average household size was 2.29 and the average family size was 2.91.

In the city, the population was spread out, with 21.3% under 18, 8.1% from 18 to 24, 30.2% from 25 to 44, 22.7% from 45 to 64, and 17.8% who were 65 or older. The median age was 38. For every 100 females, there were 86.6 males. For every 100 females 18 and over, there were 83.4 males.

The median income for a household was $46,795, and the median income for a family was $60,424. Males had a median income of $41,192 versus $29,454 for females. The per capita income was $23,562. About 4.1% of families and 6.5% of the population were below the poverty line, including 7.8% of those under 18 and 6.3% of those 65 or older.

Politics

Education
New Hope is in the Robbinsdale Area school district. Schools in New Hope include Robbinsdale Cooper High School, Meadow Lake Elementary, Robbinsdale Spanish Immersion, Sonnesyn Elementary, and Holy Trinity Lutheran School, a Christian Pre-K-8 grade school of the Wisconsin Evangelical Lutheran Synod (WELS).

Notable people
 Leo G. Adams - Minnesota state legislator
 Curt Hennig - professional wrestler, entombed at Gethsemane Cemetery.
 Dorothy Hokr - Minnesota state legislator.
 Tim Vakoc – first United States military chaplain to be critically injured during Operation Iraqi Freedom, died in New Hope.
 Rashad Vaughn - NBA player for Milwaukee Bucks
 Mark Thompson - Minnesota state legislator
 Mariana Cress - athlete in the 2016 Rio Olympics
 Lance Pitlick - NHL player for Ottawa Senators and Florida Panthers

References

External links
 City of New Hope website

 
Cities in Minnesota
Cities in Hennepin County, Minnesota
Populated places established in 1936
1936 establishments in Minnesota